Dunleckney Manor is a manor house in Muine Bheag, County Carlow, Ireland.

History
Sir Nicholas Bagenal built the original manor between 1585 and 1610. The current building dates from the 17th century. Around 1850, the heir to the Bagenal estate, Walter Newton, renovated the house, incorporating parts of the original structure.

In 1989, the house was purchased by Helen and Derek Sheane. The estate was in bad repair, requiring a new roof and extensive work to the windows and floors.

Design
The manor was redesigned around 1835 by British architect Daniel Robertson (d.1849) in the Tudor gothic style. It features ashlar masonry, oriel windows, and fan-vaulted ceilings. The ornate wooden staircase includes several medieval wooden carvings from St Canice's Cathedral in nearby Kilkenny.

See also
List of country houses in County Carlow

References

Buildings and structures in County Carlow
Houses in the Republic of Ireland